Mark Valentino Ingram Sr. (born August 23, 1965) is a former American football wide receiver in the National Football League who played for the New York Giants (1987–1992), the Miami Dolphins (1993 to 1994), the Green Bay Packers (1995), and the Philadelphia Eagles (1996). He is the father of Mark Ingram II, who won the Heisman Trophy in 2009 and is the New Orleans Saints' all-time leader in rushing yards.

Early career
Ingram played high school football at Flint Northwestern High School in Flint, Michigan. In high school, Ingram played at the quarterback position with Andre Rison at halfback. He then played college football at Michigan State University in East Lansing, Michigan. At Michigan State, Ingram was moved to the position of wide receiver, where he remained throughout his collegiate and professional career.

Professional career

Ingram was drafted by the Giants in the first round (28th overall) in the 1987 NFL Draft. He is probably best known for a third down play in Super Bowl XXV in which he eluded at least five Buffalo Bills defenders to achieve a critical first down for the Giants to sustain a long touchdown drive. He finished the game as the Giants top receiver with five catches for 77 yards. As a Miami Dolphin, in a game against the New York Jets, Ingram caught four touchdown passes from Dan Marino. The most notable was the game-winning touchdown, which was the result of Marino faking out the Jets defense by indicating he was going to spike the ball to stop the clock. Instead, he lobbed a short pass to Ingram, who was open in the end zone.

Ingram retired after the 1996 season.

Legal problems
On September 16, 2008, Ingram was sentenced to seven years in prison and up to five years of probation for money laundering and fraud. He was also ordered in a Long Island federal court to pay $252,000 in restitution. Ingram failed to show up to a federal prison in Ashland, Kentucky to turn himself in on December 5, 2008, and an arrest warrant was issued. On January 2, 2009, Ingram was arrested in a Flint, Michigan hotel room, where he was preparing to watch his son play in the 2009 Sugar Bowl.  Alabama lost the game to the Utah Utes by a score of 31–17. On March 22, 2010, in a courtroom in Central Islip, New York, Ingram was sentenced to an additional two years in prison for jumping bail to see his son, Mark Ingram II play for Alabama. He was housed at Yazoo City Federal Correctional Complex (FCC) as inmate 22749-050, and was then in the custody of the Residential Reentry Management Detroit. Ingram was released from prison in early 2015.

Personal life
Ingram's son, Mark Ingram II, played for the Alabama Crimson Tide and won the Heisman Trophy in 2009 and was drafted in the first round of the 2011 NFL Draft by the New Orleans Saints, where he is their all-time leader in rushing yardage.

References

External links
 Ingram's profile on America's Most Wanted

1965 births
Living people
African-American players of American football
American football wide receivers
American money launderers
American people convicted of fraud
American prisoners and detainees
American sportspeople convicted of crimes
Green Bay Packers players
Miami Dolphins players
Michigan State Spartans football players
New York Giants players
Philadelphia Eagles players
Players of American football from Illinois
Players of American football from Flint, Michigan
Sportspeople from Rockford, Illinois
21st-century African-American sportspeople
20th-century African-American sportspeople